Polemic is contentious rhetoric intended to support a specific position by forthright claims and to undermine the opposing position.  The practice of such argumentation is called polemics, which are seen in arguments on controversial topics. A person who writes polemics, or speaks polemically, is called a polemicist.  The word derives , .

Polemics often concern questions in religion or politics. A polemical style of writing was common in Ancient Greece, as in the writings of the historian Polybius. Polemic again became common in medieval and early modern times. Since then, famous polemicists have included satirist Jonathan Swift; Italian physicist and mathematician Galileo; French Enlightenment writer, historian, and philosopher Voltaire; Christian anarchist Leo Tolstoy; socialist philosophers Karl Marx and Friedrich Engels;  novelist George Orwell; playwright George Bernard Shaw; communist revolutionary Vladimir Lenin; psycholinguist Noam Chomsky; social critics Christopher Hitchens and Peter Hitchens; existential philosopher Søren Kierkegaard; and Friedrich Nietzsche, author of On the Genealogy of Morality: A Polemic. 

Polemical journalism was common in continental Europe when libel laws were not as stringent as they are now. 

To support study of 17th to 19th century controversies, a British research project has placed online thousands of polemical pamphlets from that period.

Discussions of atheism, humanism, and Christianity have remained open to polemic into the 21st century.

History
In Ancient Greece, writing was characterised by what Geoffrey Lloyd and Nathan Sivin called "strident adversariality" and "rationalistic aggressiveness", summed up by McClinton as polemic. For example, the ancient historian Polybius practiced "quite bitter self-righteous polemic" against some twenty philosophers, orators, and historians.

Polemical writings were common in medieval and early modern times. During the Middle Ages, polemic had a religious dimension, as in Jewish texts written to protect and dissuade Jewish communities from converting to other religions. Medieval Christian writings were also often polemical; for example in their disagreements on Islam or in the vast corpus aimed at converting the Jews. Martin Luther's 95 Theses, nailed to the door of the church in Wittenberg, was a polemic launched against the Catholic Church. Robert Carliell's 1619 defence of the new Church of England and diatribe against the Roman Catholic Church –  – took the form of a 250-line poem.

Major political polemicists of the 18th century include Jonathan Swift, with pamphlets such as his A Modest Proposal, Alexander Hamilton, with pieces such as A Full Vindication of the Measures of Congress and A Farmer Refuted, and Edmund Burke, with his attack on the Duke of Bedford.

In the 19th century, Karl Marx and Friedrich Engels's 1848 Communist Manifesto was extremely polemical. Friedrich Engels's famous work Anti-Dühring was also a polemic against Eugen Dühring.

In the 20th century, George Orwell's Animal Farm was a polemic against totalitarianism, in particular of Stalinism in the Soviet Union.  According to McClinton, other prominent polemicists of the same century include such diverse figures as Herbert Marcuse, Noam Chomsky, John Pilger, and Michael Moore.

In 2007 Brian McClinton argued in Humani that anti-religious books such as Richard Dawkins's The God Delusion are part of the polemic tradition. In 2008 the humanist philosopher A. C. Grayling published a book, Against All Gods: Six Polemics on Religion and an Essay on Kindness.

See also

 Critic
 Devil's advocate
 Dialectic
 Disputation
 Internet troll
 Irenicism
 Philippic
 Rhetoric
 Social gadfly
 Trash-talk

Notes

References

Bibliography

External links

 

Rhetoric
Aggression